Cecilie Beck is a Danish musician and audiovisual artist based in New York City, United States. She began playing the piano, her main instrument, at the age of six. In 2016, she released her debut album, Here is Now, on her own label Sound Vision Lab Inc.

Education and career 
In May 2013, Cecilie Beck earned an MFA from The Royal Danish Academy of Fine Arts. At the Academy's department 'School of Walls and Space', Beck studied Art-as-Activism and art in public spaces.

Cecilie Beck claims that she can “see sound” and “hear light”.

Beck’s music spans across a variety of music genres. She paints and draws her songs in a series called “Songs without Sound”. Other aspects of her practice include installation, performance art, video projections, books, costumes/sculptures, experimental archiving and field work.

Beck has showcased her work at various venues in New York City, such as Nublu, Rockwood Music Hall, The Knitting Factory, Paper Box, Red Door, Arlene's Grocery, Mercury Lounge, The Bitter End, La Bodega Studios, Platos Cave/Eidia House, Lesley Heller Gallery, Pianos and many more. Internationally she has presented her music at Spikersuppa Sound Gallery in Oslo, The Artist House (Museum) in Oslo, Basso in Berlin, Litteraturhaus in Copenhagen and more. Among other public rewards she received a "work grant" from the Danish Arts Foundation in 2017. In 2017, she was also put on the Danish ambassador’s "Super Danish" list along with other acclaimed artists and culture contributors abroad.

Personal life 
Beck has lived in five different countries - Denmark, Sweden, Germany, Indonesia, the United States. She now lives and works as an artist in New York (since 2012).

Collaborations 

 Fran Cathcart (Double Grammy Award winning producer) 
 Razors Productions
 DjCherishTheLuv
 Charles Burnham (violinist)
 Jackson Whalan (electronic musician and rapper) 
 Prince Harvey (hip hop artist) 
 Brandon Ross (guitarist, producer, songwriter, composer) 
 Dynasty Electric (band)
 Annika Lundgren (visual artist) 
 Nora Stephens (visual artist/dancer) 
 Grounded View (dancers) 
 Malene Korsgaard Lauritsen Twsai (photographer) 
 Mikkel Jørgensen (videographer) 
 Rebekka Elisabeth Anker-Møller (curator)
 Ayler Young (song writer)

Discography

Quotes 
Pulitzer Prize winning artist Henry Threadgill:"Upon first hearing Cecilie Beck I said to myself, after about the fourth song, ‘What a unique and original songwriter!’"

“Beck possesses a delicate voice with a lilting quality that is a combination of beguiling and femme fatale without the dagger; more akin to silken veils blowing in a gentle breeze...in the moonlight.”

Cynthia Robinson-Bioh, writer:
“(Cecilie Beck’s)... music suspends me into another dimension where all is peaceful and joyful in the world even in the midst of confusion.”

References

Danish women pianists
21st-century Danish women singers
Audiovisual artists
21st-century women pianists